The World Union of National Socialists (WUNS) is an organisation founded in 1962 as an umbrella group for neo-Nazi organisations across the globe.

History

Formation 
The movement came about when the leader of the American Nazi Party, George Lincoln Rockwell, visited England and met with National Socialist Movement chief Colin Jordan and the two agreed to work towards developing an international link-up between movements. This resulted in the 1962 Cotswold Declaration, which was signed by neo-Nazis from the United States, the United Kingdom, France (Savitri Devi), West Germany (Bruno Ludtke), Austria and Belgium. More member nations would join later throughout the decade, including Argentina, Australia, Chile, Ireland, South Africa, and Japan.

Splits 
Following Rockwell's assassination in 1967, control of the WUNS passed to Matt Koehl, who attempted to extend the influence of the group by appointing Danish neo-Nazi Povl Riis-Knudsen as general secretary. However a split began to develop over the insistence of Koehl that Nazism should also serve as a religion, and eventually he broke away from the WUNS to lead his own version of Nazi mysticism. The split fundamentally weakened the WUNS and its influence declined strongly, despite attempts by Jordan to reinvigorate it. Jordan remained the nominal leader of the organization until his death in 2009, when he was succeeded by Koehl, who was the titular leader until his own death in 2014.

Associated groups 
A number of groups have become members of the WUNS or accepted association to the group down the years.

Americas 
Given the leadership of Rockwell and Koehl, the American Nazi Party and its successor the National Socialist White People's Party were the main constituent groups of the WUNS.

In Canada the group was represented by the Canadian Nazi Party, whose leader William John Beattie was chief of the WUNS in the country.

It was also active in South America through the Partido Nacionalsocialista Chileno, a group set up in Chile by former 1st SS Division Leibstandarte SS Adolf Hitler Standartenführer Franz Pfeiffer.

Europe 
The National Socialist Movement and its successor British Movement were members.

WUNS was represented in Denmark by the National Socialist Workers' Party of Denmark, a rump group of the old pre-war movement affiliated under Sven Salicath, a close follower of Rockwell, and by its replacement, the National Socialist Movement of Denmark.

The Nordic Reich Party of Sweden maintained independence but co-operated closely with WUNS.

Bernhard Haarde formed a WUNS group in Iceland, claiming around 300 supporters. Bernhard was the brother of future Prime Minister Geir Haarde.

A minor party in the Republic of Ireland, the National Socialist Irish Workers Party, was affiliated.

Oceania 
The National Socialist Party of New Zealand and the National Socialist Party of Australia were affiliated to the WUNS.

Asia 
The National Socialist Japanese Worker's Party is affiliated to the WUNS.

Membership

The following organizations were listed on the WUNS website as participating members in 2019:

 Bulgaria – Great Sarmatian Brotherhood
 Brazil – Brazilian National Socialist Party
 Canada – National-Socialist Party of Canada
 Chile – Movimiento Nacionalsocialista de los Trabajadores Chilenos, Movimiento Gancho del Lobo, IMNS, Troops of Tomorrow Chile Division
 Costa Rica – Resistencia Ideologica Nacional Socialista de Costa Rica
 Finland – Suomen Kansallissosialistinen Työväenpuolue, SKSTP-NSFAP
 France – Mouvement National-Socialiste Français, PHENIX
 Greece – European Nationalism and Hellenic Nationalism
 Guatemala – Frente Nacional Socialista de Guatemala
 Iran – Naska Party, SUMKA
 Italy – Comunità politica di Avanguardia, Fascism and Freedom Movement
 Japan – National Socialist Japanese Workers' Party
 Norway – National Socialist Movement of Norway
 Peru - National Socialist Tercios of Nueva Castilla, National Socialist Movement “Peru Awake”, Peruvian Nacional Socialist Union.
 Romania – Romanian National Vanguard, Front 14 Romania, Victoria Finala
 Russia and Belarus – Russian National Unity, RNE AP, National Socialist Organization
 Serbia – Rasonalisti, Serbian Action
 Spain – National Alliance, NuevOrden España
 Sweden – National Socialist Movement Nordic-Scandinavia Unit, National League of Sweden (Sveriges Nationella Förbund)
 Ukraine – National Alliance for Freedom Ukrainian Falange, Ukrainian Falange Block
 United Kingdom – November 9th Society, British Free Corps, British People's Party
 United States – National Socialist Movement, Final Solution 88

The following organizations were members of the WUNS at some point:
 Argentina – Argentine National Socialist Front
 Turkey – National Socialist Movement, Final Solution 2016

See also 
 Alliance of European National Movements
 Euronat
 European National Front

References 

Neo-Nazi organizations in the United States
Organizations established in 1962
Neo-Nazi organizations
Neo-Nazi political parties